Entrelacs may refer to:

Entrelacs, Quebec, a municipality in Quebec, Canada
Entrelacs, Savoie, a commune in Savoie, France